Fehrenbach is a German locational surname, originating from German-language toponym Fehrenbach; first mentioned on 1244 as "Verinbach" in Baden-Württemberg. Notable people with the name include:

Charles Fehrenbach (disambiguation), multiple people
Constantin Fehrenbach (1852–1926), German politician
Franz Fehrenbach (born 1949), German businessman
T. R. Fehrenbach (1925–2013), American historian and writer

See also 
 3433 Fehrenbach, main-belt asteroid
 Fahrenbach (disambiguation)

German-language surnames
German toponymic surnames